Deepak Jethi (Dīpaka jēṭahāya) is an Indian actor in several Bollywood films and Indian TV series. He is also a voice-dubbing actor who dubs foreign media in Hindi. Deepak Jethi played the role of Jarnail Singh Bhindranwale in Pradhanmantri in 2013.

Filmography

Television

See also
Dubbing (filmmaking)
List of Indian dubbing artists

References

External links
 

Living people
21st-century Indian male actors
Indian male voice actors
Male actors in Hindi cinema
Male actors from Mumbai
Year of birth missing (living people)